Charles Elmer McIlveen (August 8, 1919 – May 4, 2007) was a Canadian physician and politician, who represented Oshawa in the Legislative Assembly of Ontario from 1971 to 1975 as a Progressive Conservative member. McIlveen was elected in the PC sweep, taking the seat for the working-class riding of Oshawa previously held by Cliff Pilkey and considered an NDP stronghold. In addition to serving as a member, or Chair, of several Standing and Select Committees of the Legislature, McIlveen served as the Parliamentary Assistant to the Minister of Transportation and Communication during the short-lived government of Bill Davis in 1975.

In the 1975 Ontario election, New Democrat Michael Breaugh easily reclaimed the seat.

A physician by profession, McIlveen died May 4, 2007 at the age of 87.

References

External links 
 

2007 deaths
Physicians from Ontario
Progressive Conservative Party of Ontario MPPs
Queen's University at Kingston alumni
Oshawa city councillors
1919 births